The national rugby union teams of France and South Africa (the Springboks) have been playing each other in Test rugby since 1913. Their first meeting, held in Bordeaux, was on 11 January 1913, and was won 38–5 by South Africa.

Summary

Overall

Records
Note: Date shown in brackets indicates when the record was or last set.

Results

List of series

Notes and references

External links

 
France national rugby union team matches
South Africa national rugby union team matches
Rugby union rivalries in France
Rugby union rivalries in South Africa
France–South Africa sports relations